Jeong Eun-ok is a South Korean taekwondo practitioner. 

She won a gold medal in lightweight at the 1991 World Taekwondo Championships in Athens. She won a gold medal at the 1992 Asian Taekwondo Championships.

References

External links

Year of birth missing (living people)
Living people
South Korean female taekwondo practitioners
World Taekwondo Championships medalists
Asian Taekwondo Championships medalists
20th-century South Korean women